Ancilla testudae is a species of sea snail, a marine gastropod mollusk in the family Ancillariidae, the olives and the likes.

Description

Distribution

References

External links
 Holotype at MNHN? Paris

testudae
Gastropods described in 1977